Trust Fund is a 2016 American drama film directed by Sandra L. Martin, starring Jessica Rothe, Louise Dylan and Kevin Kilner.

Cast
 Jessica Rothe as Reese Donahue
 Louise Dylan as Audrey Donahue
 Kevin Kilner as Grayson Donahue
 Sean Wing as Milo
 Matt Kane as Sam
 Ana Ortiz as Meredith
 Willie Garson as Jerry
 Esther Scott as Gloria
 Louisa Mignone as Sophia
 Rose Abdoo as Angela
 Jordi Caballero as Marcello
 Kosha Patel as Allie
 Matthew Alan as Jonathan

Reception
Renee Longstreet of Common Sense Media rated the film 2 stars out of 5 and wrote that it "lacks logic and depth".

Edwin L. Carpenter of Dove.org called the film "relevant" in "so many ways".

References

External links
 
 

American drama films
2016 drama films